Alexander Johan Hjalmar Skarsgård (born 25 August 1976) is a Swedish actor. Born in Stockholm, he began acting at age seven but quit at 13. After serving in the Swedish military, Skarsgård returned to acting and gained his first role in the US film comedy Zoolander. In 2008, he played Marine Brad Colbert in the miniseries Generation Kill. Skarsgård's breakthrough came when he portrayed vampire Eric Northman in the television series True Blood (2008–2014).

After appearing in films such as Melancholia (2011), Battleship (2012) and The Legend of Tarzan (2016), Skarsgård starred in the drama series Big Little Lies (2017–2019) as an abusive husband, which earned him a Primetime Emmy Award, a Golden Globe Award, a Critics' Choice Television Award, and a Screen Actors Guild Award. From 2019 to 2022, he appeared in the films Long Shot (2019), Godzilla vs. Kong (2021), Passing (2021), and The Northman (2022) as well as playing Randall Flagg in the miniseries The Stand (2020–2021).

Early life
Skarsgård was born on 25 August 1976 in Stockholm, Sweden. He is the eldest son of actor Stellan Skarsgård and physician My Skarsgård. His parents are divorced. He has five younger siblings: Gustaf, Sam, Bill, Eija and Valter, and two half-brothers from his father's second wife, Megan Everett. Gustaf, Bill and Valter are also actors.

A friend of his father, a director, gave Skarsgård his first film role when he was seven years old, playing Kalle Nubb in Åke and His World (Åke och hans värld). In 1989, his lead role in the Swedish television production Hunden som log (The Dog That Smiled) earned him praise and brought him to prominence in Sweden at age 13. Uncomfortable with the fame, he quit acting at that same age.

At age 19, Skarsgård applied to perform his national service. He served in the Swedish Armed Forces, in the SäkJakt ("protect and hunt") unit that dealt with anti-sabotage and anti-terrorism in the Stockholm archipelago, for 18 months. After completing his service in 1996, he left Sweden and attended Leeds Metropolitan University in England for six months. He enrolled to study English but admits he did not study much and "had a blast" instead. While there, he considered pursuing an architecture career, but chose acting instead. In 1997, he enrolled in a theatre course at Marymount Manhattan College and moved to New York City. He returned to Stockholm after six months, but his time studying theatre confirmed to him that he wanted to act.

Career

2001–2009: Career beginnings and television breakthrough

On his return to Sweden, Skarsgård began landing roles in film, television and theatrical productions. While vacationing in the United States, he auditioned for and obtained the part of a mindless model in the 2001 film Zoolander, his first role in an American film. In 2003, his performance in Hundtricket-the Movie (The Dog Trick) earned him an Guldbagge Award nomination for Best Supporting Actor. He was named the Sexiest Man in Sweden five times.

He moved to Los Angeles in 2004 but continued to work in Sweden. His break came when he was cast as US Marine Brad Colbert in the HBO miniseries Generation Kill. An adaptation of journalist Evan Wright's book of the same name, Generation Kill follows the 1st Reconnaissance Battalion of the United States Marine Corps during the early part of the Iraq War. Director Susanna White wanted to cast him, but executive producer David Simon was not convinced he could do a convincing American accent. After four auditions in three cities, Skarsgård learned the role was his just 36 hours before he had to board a plane for Namibia where the project was filming. The cast and crew spent seven months in the desert there, shooting six days a week. Skarsgård worked with a dialect coach to master the American accent.

Just before leaving to shoot Generation Kill, Skarsgård heard about the development of True Blood, an HBO series based on the Southern Vampire Mysteries novels by Charlaine Harris, which chronicle the coexistence of humans and vampires in a town in Louisiana. Though initially reluctant about playing a vampire, he sent an audition tape for the role of Bill Compton on learning that screenwriter Alan Ball was behind the project. Skarsgård had been a fan of Ball's series Six Feet Under and film American Beauty. The role went to Stephen Moyer, but Skarsgård was cast as Eric Northman, a 1,000-year-old Nordic vampire. Northman first appeared in the first season's fourth episode, and the role brought Skarsgård to prominence. To inform his portrayal, he studied the work of actors Max Schreck and Bela Lugosi and the film Nosferatu. He said that playing Northman appealed to his preference for characters who were not simply diabolical or righteous. True Blood ran on HBO from 2008 to 2014, receiving mixed reviews.

In 2009, Skarsgård appeared in the music video for pop singer Lady Gaga's "Paparazzi". He was the voice of Stefan in the 2009 animated film Metropia, directed by Tarik Saleh. In 2010, Skarsgård portrayed Terje, a gay Norwegian trekking to the North Pole, in the British mockumentary Beyond the Pole. Suit-maker Hickey Freeman chose Skarsgård to model a new look it debuted in 2010. Annie Leibovitz photographed the ad campaign, which appeared in The Wall Street Journal Magazine, GQ and Details. Skarsgård appeared on the cover of the September 2010 issue of Rolling Stone with his True Blood co-stars Anna Paquin and Stephen Moyer.

2011–present: Film and television success

In 2011, Skarsgård starred in Melancholia, a film directed by Lars von Trier. He portrayed a newlywed alongside Kirsten Dunst as his wife in the film, which premiered at the 2011 Cannes Film Festival and also co-stars his father. That same year, he appeared in Straw Dogs, a remake of the 1971 film of the same name, as Charlie Venner. The remake's director, Rod Lurie, transferred the small town setting from Cornwall to Mississippi and described Venner as "an ex-football star gone to seed". The film co-starred James Marsden and Kate Bosworth, and was released 16 September 2011.

In 2012, Skarsgård appeared alongside Taylor Kitsch and Rihanna in Peter Berg's Battleship, an adaptation of the Hasbro game. Negatively reviewed by critics, the film had a dismal performance at the box office. He also appeared alongside Julianne Moore and Steve Coogan in Scott McGehee and David Siegel's film What Maisie Knew, an adaptation of the Henry James novel of the same name. He was also part of the ensemble cast in Henry Alex Rubin's thriller Disconnect, playing opposite Paula Patton. Skarsgård starred alongside Brit Marling and Elliot Page in Zal Batmanglij's 2013 film The East. He appeared in the film The Diary of a Teenage Girl as a man who begins an affair with his girlfriend's underage daughter. It was released in August 2015. In addition to being intentional about finding nuances in the character's predatory quality, Skarsgård admitted his excitement about playing the role "without justifying or condoning" his behavior. He starred in the 2016 film The Legend of Tarzan, portraying the title character, opposite Margot Robbie as Jane. Skarsgård worked out for 7 months to prepare for the part. The film did not generate success at the box office. It received mixed reviews, with Skarsgård's performance garnering praise. He next portrayed a deviant policeman in the black comedy film War on Everyone, which was released that same year.

From 2017 to 2019, Skarsgård starred in the drama series Big Little Lies as Perry Wright, an abusive husband to Nicole Kidman's character, Celeste. He described his character as violent due to internal conflicts involving his insecurities about needing his wife. The series earned universal acclaim. Reviewing the first-season finale, The Hollywood Reporters Daniel Fienberg found Skarsgård's performance "utterly chilling". Skarsgård won the Primetime Emmy Award for Outstanding Supporting Actor in a Limited Series or Movie in 2017 for the role. He starred in the science fiction film Mute as a silent bartender in a futuristic society, which was released in February 2018. Later that year, he starred as a secretive man in The Little Drummer Girl, a miniseries that chronicles political violence in Europe in 1979. It received positive reviews. In 2019, he portrayed a sensitive German architect in The Aftermath, a film set in 1946 post-war Hamburg. He appeared in the romantic-comedy Long Shot as the prime minister of Canada. Critics were fond of the film, with The Guardians Kristy Puchko commending Skarsgård in the minor role and how he "makes a meal out of it". Released in May 2019, it had an unsuccessful commercial performance.

Skarsgård starred in The Stand, a CBS All Access miniseries based on the 1978 novel of the same name by Stephen King, portraying Randall Flagg, a charming demon. It ran from December 2020 to February 2021. He next starred in the 2021 monster film Godzilla vs. Kong, which earned positive reviews and commercial success. Skarsgård recurred during the third season of the comedy-drama series Succession as tech mogul Lukas Matsson, for which he received a nomination for the Primetime Emmy Award for Outstanding Guest Actor in a Drama Series. He portrayed Amleth in the epic film The Northman. Released in April 2022, the film garnered favorable reviews, with Richard Lawson of Vanity Fair deeming Skarsgård "a fine vessel for the film's opulent menace". In 2023, Skarsgård starred in the thriller Infinity Pool, and will return as Lukas Matsson for the fourth and final season of Succession.

Personal life
A football fan, Skarsgård supports Hammarby Fotboll, a club based in Stockholm, his birth city. In October 2010, he donated several autographed items to "Bajen Aid", the club's fundraising auction. In July 2011, he received an honorary degree from Leeds Metropolitan University, which he had attended. He identifies as a feminist.

Skarsgård was the Ambassador for the American team for a Walking With The Wounded fundraising event for wounded soldiers. He trekked to the South Pole against Team UK (Prince Harry, Ambassador) and Team Canada/Australia (actor Dominic West, Ambassador). A few days into the trek, it was decided that the competition part would be cancelled due to hazardous terrain and weather conditions, so the teams combined forces and continued together, and all three successfully reached the South Pole on 13 December 2013.

Filmography

Film

Television

Music videos

Awards and nominations

References

External links

 
 

1976 births
Living people
20th-century Swedish male actors
21st-century Swedish male actors
Alumni of Leeds Beckett University
Best Supporting Actor Golden Globe (television) winners
Male actors from Stockholm
Male feminists
Marymount Manhattan College alumni
Outstanding Performance by a Male Actor in a Miniseries or Television Movie Screen Actors Guild Award winners
Outstanding Performance by a Supporting Actor in a Miniseries or Movie Primetime Emmy Award winners
Skarsgård family
Swedish expatriates in the United States
Swedish feminists
Swedish male film actors
Swedish male television actors